Carmenta prosopis is a moth of the family Sesiidae. It was described by Henry Edwards in 1882, and is known from northern Mexico, and south-western United States.

The larvae feed on mesquites.

References

External links
mothphotographersgroup

Sesiidae
Moths described in 1882